All My Puny Sorrows is a 2021 Canadian drama film written, produced, and directed by Michael McGowan serving as an adaptation of the 2014 novel of the same name by Miriam Toews. It stars Alison Pill and Sarah Gadon as two Mennonite sisters who leave their religious lives behind. Amybeth McNulty, Mare Winningham, Donal Logue, and Aly Mawji also star in supporting roles, with Mongrel Media set to distribute the film. The film premiered at the Toronto International Film Festival on September 10, 2021, and was released in theaters in Canada on April 15, 2022. It received generally positive reviews from critics.

Cast
 Alison Pill as Yolandi "Yoli" Von Riesen
 Sarah Gadon as Elfrieda "Elf" Von Riesen
 Amybeth McNulty as Nora Von Riesen
 Mare Winningham as Lottie Von Riesen
 Donal Logue as Jake Von Riesen
 Mimi Kuzyk as Tina Von Riesen
 Aly Mawji as Nic
 Marin Almasi as Young Yoli 
 Gabrielle Jennings as Young Elf

Production
In December 2020, All My Puny Sorrows began filming in the midst of the COVID-19 pandemic in North Bay, Ontario. With a cast composed of Alison Pill, Sarah Gadon, Amybeth McNulty, Mare Winningham, Donal Logue, and Aly Mawji, filming wrapped that same month on December 16. Shot on a $5 million budget, the project was financed by multiple funding companies, including Telefilm Canada, the Northern Ontario Heritage Fund, and CBC Films. Jonathan Goldsmith composed the score for the film.

Release
The film premiered at the 2021 Toronto International Film Festival, in the Special Presentations program. It was also screened as the opening film of the 2021 Cinéfest Sudbury International Film Festival and the 2021 Calgary International Film Festival.

Reception

Critical response
On the review aggregator website Rotten Tomatoes, 73% of 40 reviews are positive, with an average rating of 6.3/10. The website's critical consensus reads, "A well-meaning but flawed adaptation of its source material, All My Puny Sorrows benefits from Alison Pill's searing performance." Metacritic, which uses a weighted average, assigned a score of 59 out of 100 based on 11 critics, indicating "mixed or average reviews".

Accolades
The Toronto International Film Festival listed the film in its annual year-end Canada's Top Ten list for 2021.

References

External links
 
 All My Puny Sorrows at Library and Archives Canada

2021 films
2021 drama films
Canadian drama films
English-language Canadian films
Films set in Manitoba
Films directed by Michael McGowan
Films based on Canadian novels
2020s English-language films
Films shot in North Bay, Ontario
2020s Canadian films